The West Ham Charity Cup was an annual amateur football tournament which was contested by teams from West Ham and the surrounding area, an area of Essex that is now part of London. Only players that lived locally were eligible to compete. The competition was founded as the West Ham Hospital Cup in 1885 by George Hay, Mayor of the County Borough of West Ham, to raise funds for the local hospital, and ran until 1931.

In March 1893, Castle Swifts faced Barking Woodville in the final, held at Clapton's Old Spotted Dog Ground in Upton Lane. The Swifts were two goals down before coming back to win the tie 4–2, with the goals coming from outside-right Grundy, inside-forwards Mitchell and Taylor and an own goal.  A local newspaper made the following account of the final:
"After the match the crowd made a rush to the Grand Stand where the Mayor presented the large silver cup to the captain of the Castle Swifts and Mr. Comerford of the Cup Committee announced that ‘the medals had not yet come to hand, but they would be forwarded to the winners as soon as possible’. With that the captain was lifted on to the shoulders of several of his followers and carried from the ground."

Three of the teams in the 1895–96 tournament were Barking, Park Grove and Thames Ironworks, who would later become West Ham United. In a semi-final in Plaistow, Thames Ironworks beat Park Grove 1–0. Park Grove protested a technicality and forced a replay at Beckton Road, which The Ironworks won 3–0. Thames Ironworks faced Barking in the final on 21 March 1896 at the Old Spotted Dog Ground, drawing 2–2. They rematched a week later, and again drew, 0–0. The final was replayed a final time on 20 April 1896 and the Irons won 1–0.

Three of the teams in the 1896–97 tournament were Manor Park, West Ham Garfield and the defending champions, Thames Ironworks, who beat Manor Park in the semi-final, and lost the 20 March 1897 final 0–1 to Garfield. Thanes Ironworks later became West Ham United.

In April 1902, Clapton Orient won the tournament by beating Clapton 1–0.

Clapton have won the competition six times.

The tournament was not held between 1915 and 1918.

Tournament history

References

Bibliography

Football competitions in London
Defunct football cup competitions in England
Annual sporting events in the United Kingdom
Recurring sporting events established in 1885
Recurring sporting events disestablished in 1931
1885 establishments in England
1931 disestablishments in England